Stephen Phillip Tompkinson (born 15 October 1965) is an English actor, known for his television roles as Marcus in Chancer  (1990), Damien Day in Drop the Dead Donkey (1990–1998), Father Peter Clifford in Ballykissangel (1996–98), Trevor Purvis in Grafters (1998–1999), Danny Trevanion in Wild at Heart (2006–2013) and Alan Banks in DCI Banks (2010–2016). He won the 1994 British Comedy Award for Best TV Comedy Actor. He also starred in the films Brassed Off (1996) and Hotel Splendide (2000).

Early life
Tompkinson was born in Stockton-on-Tees. When he was about age 4, his family moved to Scarborough, North Riding of Yorkshire and then to Lytham St Annes, Lancashire, where he grew up and attended St Bede's Roman Catholic High School in Lytham and St Mary's Sixth Form in Blackpool. Tompkinson's first lead was as a red admiral butterfly in The Plotters of Cabbage Patch Corner.

He went on to train at the Central School of Speech and Drama in London, alongside James Nesbitt and Rufus Sewell, and graduated in 1988. Tompkinson's acting career began straight out of drama school. During his last year at the London School of Speech and Drama he won the 1987 Carleton Hobbs Bursary, gaining a contract as a member of the BBC's Radio Drama Company, and had roles in radio dramas.

Along with Ewan Bailey, he performed a two-part radio drama titled Say What You Want to Hear (Swywth), written by Tim Wright and broadcast in 2010 on BBC Radio 4. His narrated radio documentaries include Brass Britain, which aired in 2008 and was reprised in 2010 on BBC Radio 2.

Television

1980s

In 1988, Tompkinson appeared with Ken Goodwin and Freddie Davies in a Channel 4 short titled Treacle, directed by Peter Chelsom. It received a 1988 BAFTA nomination in the category of Best Short Film.

During the next few years he was cast in several single-episode parts on All at No 20, Shelley, After Henry, Casualty, Made in Heaven, and Boon. He also played in three episodes of The Manageress (1989).

Also in 1989 he appeared in his first full-length made-for-TV movie. Based on a 1977 play by C.P. Taylor, And a Nightingale Sang was a romantic comedy-drama adapted for television by Jack Rosenthal.

1990s
He was cast in three episodes of Tales of Sherwood Forest (1989), nine episodes of Chancer (1990), and nine episodes of Minder (1991) It received the 1990  Prix Europa Special award for the film in the category "TV Fiction".
Between 1990 and 1998, Tompkinson starred in 66 episodes of the satirical comedy Drop The Dead Donkey. He played the ambitious but unethical reporter Damien Day, and won the 1994 British Comedy Awards "Best TV Comedy Actor" award.

In 1994, he was Private Simon 'Spock' Matlock, a history teacher and intellectual in BBC comedy drama All Quiet on the Preston Front, written by Tim Firth and set in Lancashire. Alistair McGowan replaced him after the first series because Tompkinson had other commitments. That same year he was in  Downwardly Mobile – a Yorkshire Television sitcom about a group of Yuppies – aired for one season but failed to make an impression and was not recommissioned.

From 1996 to 1998 he portrayed, in the popular Ballykissangel, the struggles of a young English Roman Catholic priest assigned as curate to a church in Ireland's 'back of beyond'. In 1998 he starred as Jim Harper in the three-part ITV psychological thriller Oktober, about a naive English teacher at a posh school in Switzerland. His character becomes a guinea pig in the trials of a new mind-altering drug. Tompkinson performed his own stunts. He says that "I grabbed this project because I'd never been asked to do anything like this before. And the chance to do stunts was one reason it was so appealing."

Also in 1998, and again in 1999, he co-starred with Robson Green in two series of Grafters, about two Geordie labourers who attempt to go into business together renovating an old London house owned by a pair of Yuppies. Tompkinson's performance was praised by James Rampton of The Independent:
It is Tompkinson who – despite having the less showy part – really catches the eye. In the shadow of a more successful brother and a domineering wife, he precisely captures an air of despondent, hen-pecked resignation. Like Eeyore, he seems to be pursued by his own personal raincloud. Nobody does defeated better. Tompkinson is an actor who's become a winner by playing the loser....Trevor can be added to the actor's growing gallery of characters whom viewers watch and think, 'I know that bloke.'

Tompkinson and Ballykissangel'''s Dervla Kirwan worked together again in 1999 on the TV version of Tim Firth's The Flint Street Nativity. They also co-starred in the 2001 mini-series Hereafter, which never aired in the UK but was released on DVD under the title Shades in the United States and Canada in 2012.

2000s
In 2001, he co-starred with Heartbeat star Nick Berry in the mini-series In Deep, as part of BBC1's Crime Doubles season. The promotional material described his performance as "Tompkinson as you have never seen him before" and a career "gamble". He agreed with that assessment: "In Deep is a very gritty drama and not the kind of thing that I'm normally associated with".

Tompkinson and Claire Skinner appeared as a couple in Series 1 of the comedy Bedtime, which aired August and September 2001.Tompkinson returned to the TV screen in 2001 with his co-star from Ballykissangel, Dervla Kirwan in a six part series entitled Shades, in which their two characters are dead but temporarily stuck on the earth as spirits trying to redeem themselves by fixing some complications and wrongs they have left behind.

The Age: Entertainment/TV & Radio (Australia), 4 March 2004 In 2002, he appeared as the character 'Ted' with co-star Dawn French in the comedy drama mini-series Ted and Alice. The sitcom Mr. Charity (2001), which aired on BBC2, was panned by the critics, drew poor viewer ratings, and was axed after six episodes.

In 2003, after a long delay, ITV aired the mini-series Lucky Jim. Tompkinson had bought the rights to the Kingsley Amis novel, which had not been adapted for some time, with the intention of playing the central character. Jack Rosenthal did the screenplay. The cast included Keeley Hawes as his co-star and love interest Christine, Robert Hardy, Helen McCrory, Denis Lawson, Hermione Norris and Penelope Wilton. The Guardian praised it as "deftly adapted by Jack Rosenthal ... immaculately done, not least because of Stephen Tompkinson's performance as Jim, with stellar support from [the rest of the cast, especially] Helen McCrory." In December 2004, he appeared as Detective Inspector Slack in a new adaptation of Agatha Christie's The Murder at the Vicarage.

In 2004, Tompkinson played his first fact-based role in BBC1's two-part drama In Denial of Murder, playing the character of the journalist Don Hale. There was controversy surrounding how the case was depicted, and in preparing to portray Don Hale he struggled to make sense of it. When asked his opinion, he explained that although he had done research to prepare for the role, he was merely an actor working from a script in which he had total faith and that he believed to be fair.

In 2005, Marian, Again was a psychological drama about the horrors that could lie within any community and just beyond anyone's front door. Owen Teale co-starred, along with Kelly Harrison in the title role and Samantha Beckinsale.

Of his role in Prime Suspect, Tompkinson says "I had a call from my agent who told me they were to film the last-ever Prime Suspect with Helen Mirren. And I said, 'Yes!' before she could finish. She said, 'There is a part you might be interested in...' and I said, 'I meant Yes, I'll do it, not Yes, please continue! I mean, here is a chance to work with one of the greatest actresses there is. Taking a part in the final Prime Suspect was the quickest decision I've ever made!"

ITV drama series Wild at Heart, created by Ashley Pharoah, began airing in the UK in January 2006 and ran for seven series. Tompkinson played Bristol veterinarian Danny Trevanion, who relocated with his family to South Africa where they attempted to build up a successful wildlife preserve and veterinary surgery. Tompkinson was also co-executive producer for 33 episodes and executive producer for one.

2010s
In 2010 he was cast as Inspector Alan Banks in  DCI Banks: Aftermath, a two-part television pilot adaptation of one of Peter Robinson's crime novels. DCI Banks: Aftermath drew seven million viewers, beating BBC1's Spooks in the ratings battle for the same timeslot. On 14 June 2013, ITV announced that DCI Banks has been commissioned for a third six-part series. He played a role in the BBC series Truckers during the same year.

Film
Barely out of drama school, he appeared in 1988 (as Stephen Duffell) with Ken Goodwin and Freddie Davies in Peter Chelsom's 11-minute short film titled Treacle. It was the tale of comedian Alfie Duffell's melodic legacy, set amid the Blackpool variety scene. The work received a 1988 BAFTA nomination in the category of Best Short Film.

In 1996 he starred in a British-made international feature film, Brassed Off, about a brass band in Grimley, a fictional Yorkshire colliery town where the mines are being shut down by the Tory government in the name of progress.

In 2000, he played the role of Dezmond Blanche in the bleakly satirical film Hotel Splendide.

In February 2012, he filmed his first lead role in a feature film titled Harrigan, described on its 2013 release in Britain as having "a thin budget and cartoonish script".Harrigan hits the screen at last, GazetteLive, 24 January 2012 

Stage
Tompkinson has said repeatedly that he enjoys the challenge of mixing television and film roles with live stage productions. He has appeared on stage in London's West End and in theatres across the UK. Of the 1992 production of Michael Wall's Women Laughing at the Royal Exchange Theatre, Alan Hulme of the Manchester Evening News described the cast as "superb....and the acting has the shocking eloquence of picture postcards in acid." And The Independent described The End of the Food Chain (1994) at the Stephen Joseph Theatre in Scarborough as "excellent" and "vividly acted."

2003 saw him starring as Mortimer Brewster, along with Michael Richards of Seinfeld fame, in Arsenic and Old Lace at The Strand Theatre in London. The part required him to deliver his lines in a New York drawl. One reviewer commented, "The fact that many American audience members...assumed that Stephen was a bone fide American confirms the authenticity of his twang."

In 2007, he toured in Charley's Aunt, playing the role of Donna Lucia D'Alvadorez. In a review in the British Theatre Guide Sheila Connor said:
This is Stephen Tompkinson as you have never seen him before – hilarious even before he dons the frock. His manner, voice, expression and actions are spot-on....totally uproariously funny....It is at Babb's entrance that the play really takes off, Tompkinson revealing himself to be an inspired comic genius to add to his multitude of diverse credits....A truly entertainingly hilarious performance, and it is to be hoped that Tompkinson will treat us to more of the same.

In 2008, he played the deeply sinister and complex lead character of Vindice in the Jacobean bloodbath The Revenger's Tragedy at the Royal Exchange Theatre in Manchester. He felt sympathy for the character and explained why the play appealed to him:
<blockquote>He's not a villain, he's an anti-hero, really. You can see he has been wronged. The audience get to be voyeurs and enjoy watching him get his retribution. It's the black-and-white morality of the play, its bloodthirsty nature, that appealed to me. The way that things are dealt with, there was no red tape: it was out with the poison or the sword if you were wronged.<ref name="revenger">The Revenger's Tragedy, Royal Exchange, Manchester, The Independent, 27 May 2008]</ref></blockquote>

In 2009, he toured in Sign of the Times, playing the character of Frank Tollit, who has spent the past 25 years putting up letters on buildings but dreams of becoming a novelist. His  colleague Alan (Tom Shaw), 30 years his junior, wants to be a rock star. Tompkinson said, "The play is a comedy but much more. It is about having dreams and ambition; it's about happiness and failure. Frank's good at his job; he does enjoy it, but he has bigger dreams. I think everyone will be able to relate to it."

When Shaun Prendergast, who is a friend, wrote Faith and Cold Reading he created the part of a villain called Freddie the Suit for Tompkinson. The staging of that play at the Live Theatre in Newcastle in February–March 2011 is his most recent stage run.

Tompkinson made his musical theatre debut in London's West End in the lead role of King Arthur in Monty Python's Spamalot at the Playhouse Theatre 20 November 2012.

In 2018, he played Yvan in the UK tour of Art, having previously played the role at the Wyndham's Theatre in London's West End in 2000.

During the Christmas 2018 season he played Ebenezer Scrooge in Jack Thorne's new adaptation of A Christmas Carol at The Old Vic, London.

In 2019 he is touring a production of Willy Russell's Educating Rita, co-starring with Jessica Johnson. This has been very well received by both critics and audiences.

Presenter
Tompkinson has hosted or narrated a number of other UK television programs, including a FIFA 100 Years of Football documentary. In 1999, he presented the BBC2 documentary Great Railway Journeys: Singapore to Bangkok, part of Series 4 of the popular Great Railway Journeys travel documentaries that aired over many years in the UK and on PBS in the U.S.

In 2009, he took part in the documentary, Stephen Tompkinson's Great African Balloon Adventure, a three-part series inspired by Jules Verne's first novel Five Weeks in a Balloon. It followed Tompkinson and his guide, hot air ballooning expert Robin Batchelor, as they travelled 6,108 miles in six weeks from coast to coast, above and on the ground in Tanzania, Rwanda, Zambia, Botswana and Namibia. The series aired on ITV in the UK in June 2009 and was later distributed by American Public Television in the U.S. The African balloon series was well received, and ITV commissioned a three-part follow-up series that aired on ITV1 in 2010, titled Stephen Tompkinson's Australian Balloon Adventure.

Narrator/voice-over
He has done a variety of voice-over work, including adverts, audio books, and narration. His many adverts include BT Childline, British Midland, Motorola, Alton Towers, Comet, Eurostar, Laphroaig Whisky, Mercury & Kwiksave, Bulmers Cider, Tetley Tea and the People's Dispensary for Sick Animals.PDSA creates animal magic!, undated 

His narrated TV programmes and shows include Little Red Tractor, Trail of Guilt: Harold Shipman: Addicted to Murder (2000), When Snooker Ruled the World (2002), A Band for Britain (2010)and Choccywoccydoodah (2014). In addition, he has narrated numerous audiobooks.

Director
In 2006, Tompkinson made his directing debut in the Midlands, at the helm of the BBC1 afternoon drama The Lightning Kid. He was shadowed by a film crew making the documentary Director's Debut: Stephen Tompkinson's Story that aired immediately prior to the drama, with the intent of revealing the challenges faced by a new director.

Awards(Source: [https://www.imdb.com/name/nm0867017/awards Internet Movie Database (IMDB), unless otherwise cited)

Other involvements
Tompkinson has supported various causes by providing promotional videos or voiceovers. These include a fundraising effort toward research to find a cure for Duchenne Muscular Dystrophy (DMD) and a financial appeal by Chester Zoo He has also supported causes such as the Westminster Carers Time Bank and, in 2008, he became an Ambassador for Project African Wilderness (PAW), a not-for-profit organisation that seeks to protect and restore the Mwabvi Wildlife Reserve in Malawi.

In February 2012, Tompkinson supported the launch of a foundation established by Robbie Elliot, the former Newcastle United footballer who had helped Tompkinson improve his fitness for filming  Harrigan. Elliott was proposing to complete a charity bicycle ride to raise funds for the Sir Bobby Robson Foundation and Breakthrough Breast Cancer. Stories captured along the ride – from Lisbon to Newcastle – will be made into a documentary narrated by Tompkinson and premiered in London in late 2012.

In late 2011, he recorded an advert for Text Santa, a charity initiative set up by ITV to support nine UK charities at Christmas. Stars of other ITV shows made similar adverts. In January 2012, it was announced that £4,120,000 was raised for the various charities.

Over the years he has participated in Comic Relief's Red Nose Day. In 2001, he was one of the team describing the work the charity does in Britain, helping victims of early Alzheimer's or teenagers who are HIV positive. In 1997, Tompkinson and Kirwan did a Comic Relief sketch titled Ballykissdibley – with Dawn French and the cast of The Vicar of Dibley – in which they played their Ballykissangel characters, Fr. Peter Clifford and Assumpta Fitzgerald.

Personal life
He was married to Celia Anastasia and subsequent to the couple's divorce he became engaged to Ballykissangel co-star Dervla Kirwan. He then married Nicci Taylor, with whom he has a daughter, Daisy Ellen. It was announced in December 2006 that they had separated and would divorce.

He is an avid cricket fan. He once said that if he wasn't an actor he "wouldn't mind travelling the world as a cricket commentator, enjoying endless summers." In 2008 he wrote an article for The Wisden Cricketer about Darren Gough.

On 10 August 2022, Tompkinson pleaded not guilty to inflicting grievous bodily harm. Tompkinson is set to appear at Crown Court for trial in September 2022.

Filmography

Television

Film
(chronologically descending)

Stage
(chronologically descending)
(see above for additional detail)

Radio
(chronologically descending)

*90-minute radio play presented on the centenary of Agatha Christie's birth

References

External links

Stephen Tompkinson at bbc.co.uk (last updated October 2005)

1965 births
Alumni of the Royal Central School of Speech and Drama
English male film actors
English male radio actors
English male stage actors
English male television actors
Living people
Actors from County Durham
Actors from Stockton-on-Tees
Members of the Order of the British Empire
20th-century English male actors
21st-century English male actors